The Avenir Sportif de Kasserine is a Tunisian football club based in Kasserine, Tunisia. The team evolves in the Ligue 1.
The Club also has a Handball and a Basketball teams.

History
The club was founded in 1948. The team has known its golden era in the late 1980s when the team was promoted for the first time to the Ligue 1 at the end of the 1987 season. The team remained in the top level for three consecutive years before being relegated again to the Ligue 2, until 1992 when they were briefly promoted to the Ligue 1 for one season before being relegated again. They came back to Ligue 1 in 2008 and again in 2015.

Honours
Tunisian League 2: 2
Champions: 1986–87, 1991–92
Runner-up: 2007–08.

Managers
 Taoufik Ben Othman (1999)

References

Association football clubs established in 1948
Football clubs in Tunisia
1948 establishments in Tunisia
Sports clubs in Tunisia